Operation Iron Triangle was a military operation in the Iraq War. The operation was led by Michael D. Steele in 2006. The operation targeted a suspected al-Qaeda in Iraq training facility southwest of the city of Samarra near the Muthana Chemical Complex south of Lake Tharthar.

Iron Triangle Murders 
In the first few hours of the operation, two active duty soldiers from Charlie Company 3/187th Infantry Regiment executed three unarmed Iraqi detainees. The soldiers claimed that they were acting on the orders of their squad leader (who was the leader on the ground at the time) as well as the Brigade Commander:
Colonel Michael Steele. Steele denied giving such an order, and was formally reprimanded but not charged. One of the soldiers later testified that they had cut the Iraqis loose and let them run before shooting them, to make the incident look like an escape attempt. A third soldier was also subsequently involved by carrying out a "mercy killing". The third soldier later made an arrangement with the government to plead guilty to a reduced charge of aggravated assault. A team of civilian and military lawyers defended the two soldiers and their squad leader in Article 32 proceedings (military equivalent to a grand jury) in Tikrit, Iraq and Courts Martial proceedings in Fort Campbell, Kentucky.  The third soldier was defended by two military lawyers in the same proceedings, but was considered to be separate from the other two soldiers. After eight months of legal battles, the third soldier who was subsequently involved agreed to testify against the other defendants. Facing mandatory life sentences, the two soldiers who carried out the executions entered plea deals that reduced their maximum sentence to 18 years, making them eligible for parole after 5½ years. According to his lawyers, the third soldier was "to be convicted of aggravated assault and to receive a nine-month prison sentence in exchange for his testifying against three other members of his squad."

References

3. http://www.armytimes.com/news/2008/12/army_sgtstaffsgt_120308w/

Further reading
Stjepan G. Mestrovic (2009), The Good Soldier on Trial: A Sociological Study of Misconduct by the US Military Pertaining to Operation Iron Triangle, Iraq, Algora Publishing. 
Raffi Khatchadourian (2009), The Kill Company: Did a colonel’s fiery rhetoric set the conditions for a massacre? The New Yorker July 6 &13 2009 issue.

External links

Military operations of the Iraq War involving the United States
Military operations of the Iraq War in 2006